Koni-Djodjo is a town located on the island of Anjouan in the Comoros. Population of Koni-Djodjo is 7,232 occupants according to 2002 latest census.

References

Populated places in Anjouan